Foz do Tua is a small village in Portugal on the right bank of the Douro river, near the town of Carrazeda de Ansiães, in the Bragança district. It is surrounded by some of the most beautiful and important farms (Portuguese: quinta(s)) in the Douro Valley - Quinta Foz Tua, Quinta do Tua (Cockburn's), Quinta dos Aciprestes (Real Companhia Velha) and Quinta dos Malvedos (Graham's - Symington family). It is accessed by boat, car and train(Linha do Douro). It is also possible to see a very interesting bridge that represents a previous model of Porto's Arrábida Bridge, designed by Edgar Cardoso.

Carrazeda de Ansiães